In finance and investing, the dividend discount model (DDM) is a method of valuing the price of a company's stock based on the fact that its stock is worth the sum of all of its future dividend payments, discounted back to their present value. In other words, DDM is used to value stocks based on the net present value of the future dividends. The constant-growth form of the DDM is sometimes referred to as the Gordon growth model (GGM), after Myron J. Gordon of the Massachusetts Institute of Technology, the University of Rochester, and the University of Toronto, who published it along with Eli Shapiro in 1956 and made reference to it in 1959. Their work borrowed heavily from the theoretical and mathematical ideas found in John Burr Williams 1938 book "The Theory of Investment Value," which put forth the dividend discount model 18 years before Gordon and Shapiro.

When dividends are assumed to grow at a constant rate, the variables are:  is the current stock price.  is the constant growth rate in perpetuity expected for the dividends.  is the constant cost of equity capital for that company.  is the value of dividends at the end of the first period.

Derivation of equation 
 
This summation can be rewritten as

where

The series in parenthesis is the geometric series with common ratio  so it sums to  if . Thus,
 

Substituting the value for  leads to
 ,

Income plus capital gains equals total return 
The DDM equation can also be understood to state simply that a stock's total return equals the sum of its income and capital gains. 
 is rearranged to give 
So the dividend Yield  plus the Growth  equals Cost of Equity .

Consider the dividend growth rate in the DDM model as a proxy for the growth of earnings and by extension the stock price and capital gains. Consider the DDM's cost of equity capital as a proxy for the investor's required total return.

Growth cannot exceed cost of equity 
From the first equation, one might notice that  cannot be negative. When growth is expected to exceed the cost of equity in the short run, then usually a two-stage DDM is used:

Therefore,

Even when g is very close to r, P approaches infinity, so the model becomes meaningless.

Some properties of the model
 a)
When the growth g is zero, the dividend is capitalized.
.

 b)

 c)
which is equivalent to the formula of the Gordon Growth Model  (or Yield-plus-growth Model):

 = 

where “” stands for the present stock value, “” stands for expected dividend per share one year from the present time, “g” stands for rate of growth of dividends, and “k” represents the required return rate for the equity investor.

Problems with the constant-growth form of the model
The following shortcomings have been noted; 
see also .
The presumption of a steady and perpetual growth rate less than the cost of capital may not be reasonable.
If the stock does not currently pay a dividend, like many growth stocks, more general versions of the discounted dividend model must be used to value the stock. One common technique is to assume that the Modigliani-Miller hypothesis of dividend irrelevance is true, and therefore replace the stock's dividend D with E earnings per share. However, this requires the use of earnings growth rather than dividend growth, which might be different. This approach is especially useful for computing the residual value of future periods.
The stock price resulting from the Gordon model is sensitive to the growth rate  chosen; see

Related methods 

The dividend discount model is closely related to both discounted earnings and discounted cashflow models. In either of the latter two, the value of a company is based on how much money is made by the company. For example, if a company consistently paid out 50% of earnings as dividends, then the discounted dividends would be worth 50% of the discounted earnings. Also, in the dividend discount model, a company that is not expected to pay dividends ever in the future is worth nothing, as the owners of the asset ultimately never receive any cash.

References

Further reading

External links
Alternative derivations of the Gordon Model and its place in the context of other DCF-based shortcuts

Stock market
Financial models
Economics models
Valuation (finance)